The 2001/02 FIS Freestyle Skiing World Cup was the twenty third World Cup season in freestyle skiing organised by International Ski Federation. The season started on 8 September 2001 and ended on 10 March 2002. This season included three disciplines: aerials, moguls and dual moguls. 

After one season break, dual moguls again counted as season title and was awarded with small crystal globe separately from moguls.

Men

Moguls

Aerials

Ladies

Moguls

Aerials

Men's standings

Overall 

Standings after 18 races.

Moguls 

Standings after 9 races.

Aerials 

Standings after 6 races.

Dual moguls 

Standings after 3 races.

Ladies' standings

Overall 

Standings after 19 races.

Moguls 

Standings after 9 races.

Aerials 

Standings after 7 races.

Dual moguls 

Standings after 3 races.

Nations Cup

Overall 

Standings after 37 races.

Men 

Standings after 18 races.

Ladies 

Standings after 19 races.

References

External links

FIS Freestyle Skiing World Cup
World Cup
World Cup